Football at the 1970 Asian Games was held in Bangkok, Thailand from 10 to 20 December 1970.

Medalists

Squads

Results

Preliminary round

Group A

Group B

Group C

Quarterfinals

Group Aa

Group Bb

5th place match

Knockout round

Semifinals

Bronze medal match

Gold medal match

Final standing

References

External links
 Football at the 1970 Asian Games – RSSSF

 
1970 Asian Games events
1970
Asian Games
1970 Asian Games